Strange may refer to:

Fiction
 Strange (comic book), a comic book limited series by Marvel Comics
 Strange (Marvel Comics), one of a pair of Marvel Comics characters known as The Strangers
 Adam Strange, a DC Comics superhero
 The title character of the television series The Journey of Allen Strange
 Doc Strange, a Thrilling Comics character
 Doctor Strange, a Marvel Comics character
 Stephen Strange (Marvel Cinematic Universe), a film character based on the comic book character
 Hugo Strange, a DC Comics character
 Jonathan Strange, a magician in the novel Jonathan Strange & Mr Norrell by Susanna Clarke and the miniseries adaptation

Music
 Strange (video), a compilation of music videos by Depeche Mode
 Strange Music, a record label founded by Travis O'Guin and rapper Tech N9ne

Songs
"Strange" (Celeste song), 2019
 "Strange" (En Vogue song), 1991
 "Strange" (Miranda Lambert song), 2022
 "Strange" (Reba McEntire song), 2009
 "Strange" (Wet Wet Wet song), 1997
 "Strange", by Agust D featuring RM from D-2, 2020
 "Strange", by Boogiemonsters from Riders of the Storm: The Underwater Album, 1994
 "Strange", by Built to Spill from Ancient Melodies of the Future, 2001
 "Strange", by the Feeling from Twelve Stops and Home, 2006
 "Strange", by Gabrielle Aplin from Dear Happy, 2020
 "Strange", by Galaxie 500 from On Fire, 1989
 "Strange", by Jasan Radford from the soundtrack of Digimon: The Movie, 2000
 "Strange", by Joe Satriani from Flying in a Blue Dream, 1989
 "Strange", by Patsy Cline from She's Got You, 1962
 "Strange", by Poison from Power to the People, 2000
 "Strange", by Screamin' Jay Hawkins, covered by Elvis Costello from Kojak Variety, 1995
 "Strange", by Tokio Hotel and Kerli from the soundtrack of Almost Alice, 2010
 "Strange", by Wire from Pink Flag, 1977

Other uses
 Strange (surname), a family name
 Strangeness, a property of elementary particles in physics
 Strange, Ontario, Canada, a hamlet
 Strange (TV series), a British programme
 Strange+, Japanese manga series
 The Strange, a tabletop RPG

See also

 
 
 "People Are Strange", a 1967 song by the American rock band The Doors
 Strangers (disambiguation)
 Strang (disambiguation)
 The Stranger (disambiguation)